Stadthagen  is a railway station located in Stadthagen, Germany. The station is located on the Hanover–Minden railway. The train services are operated by Deutsche Bahn and WestfalenBahn.

Train services
The station is served by the following services:

Regional services  Rheine - Osnabrück - Minden - Hanover - Braunschweig
Regional services  Bielefeld - Herford - Minden - Hanover - Braunschweig
Hannover S-Bahn services  Minden - Haste - Wunstorf - Hanover - Weetzen - Haste

S-Bahn Hannover
Stadthagen is served by the S1. It is in the Außenraum zone of Hannover. For Information see www.gvh.de

References

Railway stations in Lower Saxony
Hannover S-Bahn stations